The 1976 Cork Intermediate Hurling Championship was the 67th staging of the Cork Intermediate Hurling Championship since its establishment by the Cork County Board in 1909. The draw for the opening round fixtures took place on 25 January 1976. The championship ran from 16 May to 12 September 1976.

On 12 September 1975, Newtownshandrum won the championship following a 2–10 to 1–12 defeat of Passage in the final. This was their second championship title overall and their first title since 1953.

Passage's Bernie Meade was the championship's top scorer with 1-20.

Team changes

To Championship

Promoted from the Cork Junior Hurling Championship
 Inniscarra

Regraded from the Cork Senior Hurling Championship
 Cloughduv

From Championship

Promoted to the Cork Senior Hurling Championship
 Ballinhassig

Results

First round

Quarter-finals

Semi-finals

Final

Championship statistics

Top scorers

Overall

In a single game

References

Cork Intermediate Hurling Championship
Cork Intermediate Hurling Championship